Wei Chun may refer to:

 Wei Guanzhi (760-821), chancellor during Emperor Xianzong's reign
 Wei Chuhou (773-829), chancellor during Emperor Wenzong's reign